Ma Zhanhai (died 1932) was a Chinese Muslim Battalion Commander who was killed in action during the Qinghai Tibet War which was part of the Sino-Tibetan War. He served in Ma Bufang's Qinghai army.

References

1932 deaths
Chinese Muslim generals
Members of the Kuomintang
National Revolutionary Army generals
Warlords in Republican China
Year of birth missing